John Drysdale (2 December 1913 – 1965) was a Scottish footballer who played for Queen's Park, Rangers, Kilmarnock and Dumbarton. His main position was right half, but he is also recorded as featuring at centre forward (scoring five times in nine league appearances for Rangers in that role during the 1935–36 season), centre half (seven appearances as the Gers won the Scottish Football League title in 1936–37) and right back.

References

1913 births
1965 deaths
Date of death missing
Scottish footballers
Footballers from Dunfermline
Tranent Juniors F.C. players
Scottish Junior Football Association players
Scottish Football League players
Dumbarton F.C. wartime guest players
Raith Rovers F.C. wartime guest players
Lincoln City F.C. wartime guest players
Notts County F.C. wartime guest players
Rangers F.C. players
Kilmarnock F.C. players
Queen's Park F.C. players
St Cuthbert Wanderers F.C. players
Newton Stewart F.C. players
Association football wing halves